No Guts No Glory (abbreviated as NGNG) is the debut studio album by Nigerian rapper Phyno. It was released by Sputnet Records and Penthauze Music on March 20, 2014. The album features guest appearances from P-Square, Omawumi, Olamide, Stormrex, Efa, Flavour N'abania, Runtown, Ice Prince, M.I, Mr Raw, Timaya and Illbliss. Phyno enlisted Major Bangz, WizzyPro, Chopstix and JStunt to assist with production. Initially scheduled for release in November 2013, the album was strategically postponed in order to capitalize on the downtime of the Nigerian Music Industry during the first quarter of the year. No Guts No Glory was supported by four singles: "Ghost Mode", "Man of the Year", "Parcel" and "O Set". It was primarily recorded in Igbo and Nigerian Pidgin. Critical reception to the album was generally positive, with many critics commending its indigenous sound and lyrical depth.

Background and composition
On March 15, 2014, Phyno released the album's cover art and track listing. He promoted the album by rolling out several tee shirts with the NGNG logo. Phyno narrated his life story in a hilarious manner on the album's intro. "Alobam" is an ode to his friends who have contributed to his success; the song's instrumental is a cross between Drake's "Worst Behavior" and Olamide's "Sitting on the throne". "Good Die Young" samples Marvin Gaye's version of "Abraham, Martin and John" and is a tribute to the friends Phyno lost to diseases, accident and armed robbery. "Nme Nme" is a groovy highlife throwback song about life's enjoyment, while "Chukwu Na Enye" is a highlife song with a gospel feel. Nigeria's rich language diversity is displayed in "Aju (She Know It)".

Singles and other releases
The Olamide-assisted track "Ghost Mode" was released on September 25, 2012, as the album's lead single. It won Best Collabo at both the 2012 The Headies Awards and 2013 Nigeria Entertainment Awards. The music video for "Ghost Mode" was shot and directed in Lagos by Clarence Peters.

The album's second single "Man of the Year (Obago)" was released on March 23, 2013. The song was produced by Phyno and won Best Rap Single at The Headies 2012. The music video for the song was also shot and directed by Clarence Peters in Abakpa Nike, and features a cameo appearance from Illbliss. In September 2013, the Nigerian Broadcasting Corporation banned the music video from being broadcast.

The album's third single "Parcel" was released on October 11, 2013. It was originally titled "Parcel (a Big Nwa)". The Clarence Peters-directed music video for the song was released on February 19, 2014. The album's fourth single "O Set" was released on March 4, 2014. It was produced by WizzyPro and features guest vocals by P-Square. The music video for "O Set" was directed by Jude Engees Okoye and uploaded to YouTube at approximately 4 minutes.

On May 22, 2014, Phyno released the Clarence Peters-directed visuals for "Alobam". The song was produced by Major Bangz and is an Igbo slang for "My Guy". In the video, Phyno paid tribute to some of his peers including Ice Prince, Flavour, P-Square, Olamide and J Martins. On September 2, 2014, Phyno released the visuals for the Flavour-assisted track "Authe (Authentic)".

Critical reception

No Guts No Glory received generally positive reviews from music critics. Chiagoziem Onyekwena of Nigerian Entertainment Today awarded the album 4.1 stars out of 5, acknowledging it for widening "the landscape of indigenous Nigerian Hip-Hop". Wilfred Okiche of YNaija said Phyno "makes some dubious decisions instead and dilutes the punch hinted at by the title." Joey Akan of Pulse Nigeria opined that NGNG "sure works" and said its "importance far outweighs the personal benefits for Phyno". Obina Agwu of Premium Times newspaper called NGNG a "solid debut rap album", but ended the review saying Phyno "fell for the common industry misconception that an album must parade big names".

Accolades
No Guts No Glory was nominated for Rap Album of the Year at the 2014 City People Entertainment Awards. It was also nominated for Best Rap Album and Album of the Year at The Headies 2014.

Track listing

Notes
"—" denotes a skit
Samples
"Good Die Young" samples Marvin Gaye's version of "Abraham, Martin and John".

Personnel

Azubuike Nelson – primary artist, producer, writer, performer
Major Bangz – producer
Wizzy Pro – producer
Chopstix – producer
JStunt  – producer
Stormrex  – featured artist, writer
Peter and Paul Okoye  – featured artist, writer
Omawumi Megbele – featured artist, writer
Olamide Adedeji – featured artist, writer  
Efa Iwara – featured artist, writer
Chinedu Okoli – featured artist, writer
Douglas Jack-Agu – featured artist, writer
Panshak Zamani – featured artist, writer 
Jude Abaga – featured artist, writer
Ukeje Okechukwu – featured artist, writer 
Enetimi Odom – featured artist, writer
Tobechukwu Ejiofor – featured artist, writer
Chioma Omeruah – writer, skit
The Goretti Company – management

Release history

References

2014 debut albums
Phyno albums
Albums produced by Chopstix
Igbo-language albums
Igbo highlife albums
Albums produced by Major Bangz